Still the Same may refer to:

 "Still the Same" (Bob Seger song), 1978
 "Still the Same" (Slade song), 1987
 "Still the Same" (Sugarland song), 2017
 Still the Same... Great Rock Classics of Our Time, a 2006 album by Rod Stewart